The 1982 Oklahoma gubernatorial election was held on November 2, 1982, and was a race for Governor of Oklahoma. Democrat George Nigh won re-election by a substantial majority over the Republican, former State Auditor and Inspector Tom Daxon. This is the last gubernatorial election in which the Democratic candidate carried every county in the state.

Democratic primary

Results

Republican primary

Results

General election

Results

References

1982
Gubernatorial
Okla